The 2014 PSA Men's World Squash Championship is the men's edition of the 2014 World Championship, which serves as the individual world championship for squash players. The event took place in Doha in Qatar from 14 to 21 November 2014. Ramy Ashour won his third World Championship title, defeating Mohamed El Shorbagy in the final.

Prize money and ranking points
For 2014, the prize purse was $325,000. The prize money and points breakdown is as follows:

Seeds

Draw and results

Finals

Top half

Section 1

Section 2

Bottom half

Section 1

Section 2

See also
World Championship
2014 Women's World Open Squash Championship

References

External links
Official SquashSite website
PSA World Championship page

World Squash Championships
M
Squash
Men's World Open Squash Championship 
21st century in Doha
Squash tournaments in Qatar
Sports competitions in Doha
International sports competitions hosted by Qatar